Hinea is a genus of small sea snails, marine gastropod molluscs in the family Planaxidae.

Species
Species in the genus Hinea include:
 Hinea akuana (Rehder, 1980)
 Hinea atra (Pease, 1869)
 Hinea brasiliana (Lamarck, 1822)
 Hinea fasciata (Pease, 1868)
 Hinea inepta (Gould, 1861)
 Hinea lineata (E. M. da Costa, 1778) - dwarf planaxis
 Hinea longispira (E. A. Smith, 1872)
 Hinea nucleola (Mörch, 1876)
 Hinea punctostriata (E. A. Smith, 1872)
 Hinea zonata (A. Adams, 1853)

References

External links

Powell A. W. B., New Zealand Mollusca, William Collins Publishers Ltd, Auckland, New Zealand 1979 
 Gray, J. E. (1847). A list of the genera of recent Mollusca, their synonyma and types. Proceedings of the Zoological Society of London. (1847) 15: 129-219.
 Dall, W. H. (1926). New shells from Japan and the Loochoo Islands. Proceedings of the Biological Society of Washington. 39: 63-66

Planaxidae
Gastropods of Australia
Gastropods of New Zealand
Gastropod genera
Taxa named by John Edward Gray